Llamayuq (Quechua llama llama, -yuq a suffix, "the one with a llama (or llamas)", also spelled Llamayoc) is a mountain in the Cordillera Central in the Andes of Peru which reaches a height of approximately . It is located in the Lima Region, Yauyos Province, Huantán District. Llamayuq lies southeast of T'uruyuq and Wamp'una.

References 

Mountains of Peru
Mountains of Lima Region